Phragmites americanus, common name American reed, is a species of plant found in North America. It is listed as a special concern in Connecticut.

References

Molinieae